The Netherlands selected their Junior Eurovision entry for 2007 through Junior Songfestival 2007, a national final consisting of 10 songs spread out into two semi-finals and a final. The winners were Lisa, Amy & Shelley with the song "Adem in, adem uit".

Before Junior Eurovision

Junior Songfestival 2007
The final consisted of two semi-finals and one final. Each semi-final had 5 songs, with 2 advancing to the final. A wildcard was given to one song, which was then allowed to go to the final.

The votes were awarded as follows:
Kids jury - A jury of children aged under 16 years
Televoting

Semi-final 1

Semi-final 2

Final

At Junior Eurovision
Lisa, Amy & Shelley performed 10th on the night of the contest, held in the Dutch city of Rotterdam. They received 39 points, placing 11th of the 17 competing countries.

Voting

Notes

References

Netherlands
Junior Eurovision Song Contest
2007